Bullia tranquebarica, common name the lined bullia, is a species of sea snail, a marine gastropod mollusk in the family Nassariidae, the Nassa mud snails or dog whelks.

Description
The shell grows to a length of 35 mm.

The narrow shell is elongated and subturreted. It is of a bright, transparent ash color, covered with longitudinal waved and reddish lines. The elongated spire is composed of seven or eight slightly convex whorls. They are marked at their upper part by a marginated suture, and two slightly apparent striae towards the base. The body whorl is shorter than the spire, marked at its base with regular, transverse striae or ridges. The oval aperture is oblong, smooth and white. The outer lip is thin and sharp, slightly plaited internally. The columella, slightly arcuated, is terminated by a pretty prominent oblique fold.

Distribution
This species occurs in the Indian Ocean off Madagascar.

References

 Dautzenberg, Ph. (1929). Mollusques testacés marins de Madagascar. Faune des Colonies Francaises, Tome III
 Odhner, N.H.J. (1919). Contribution a la faune malacologique de Madagascar. Arkiv For Zoologi, K. Svenska Vetenskapsakademien 12(6). 52 pp, 4 pl.
 Cernohorsky W. O. (1984). Systematics of the family Nassariidae (Mollusca: Gastropoda). Bulletin of the Auckland Institute and Museum 14: 1–356

External links
 

Nassariidae
Gastropods described in 1798